Blue Rathgore was a blue Irish cheese made from goat's milk. It was produced from 1989 until at least 2000 by the Woodside Dairy in Finaghy, Belfast, Northern Ireland.

Blue Rathgore cheese had a spicy flavour with a crumbly and moist texture.

See also
 List of goat milk cheeses
 List of Irish cheeses
 List of British cheeses

References

Goat's-milk cheeses
Cheeses from Northern Ireland